"Marș triumfal", or "Marș triumfal și primirea steagului și a Măriei Sale Prințul Domnitor" by its long name, was the first anthem of Romania. In 1861, a contest was organized to decide the national anthem of the country with a prize of 100 golden coins. Hübsch was the winner, and the march was officially adopted on 22 January 1862.

"Marș triumfal" is now used by the Romanian Army for ceremonies or high-ranking foreign persons, being known as "Marș de întâmpinare al Armatei României".

References

External links

Kingdom of Romania
Historical national anthems
National symbols of Romania
European anthems
Romanian patriotic songs
Romanian military marches
Royal anthems
1861 songs
Romanian-language songs